Sheykh Hasan (also Romanized as Sheykh Ḩasan; also known as Sheykh Ḩoseyn) is a village in Hoseynabad Rural District, in the Central District of Shush County, Khuzestan Province, Iran. At the 2006 census, its population was 419, in 65 families.

References 

Populated places in Shush County